Noakhali is the south coastal district of Bangladesh. government and many non-government education institution are situated here, including NSTU.

This is a list of educational institutions in Noakhali District, Bangladesh.Noakhali Science and Technology University (NSTU),Noakhali, Noakhali Medical College, Begumganj, Noakhali Textile Engineering College, Begumganj, Noakhali Government College, Noakhali,National Model College- Noakhali ,Noakhali Government Girls' College, Noakhali Government High School,Begumganj Piot School  Mosharraf Grammar School, Noakhali, Westwind English Medium School, Sonaimuri,Noakhali are to mentioned. Some institutes need to include in the list.

Universities

 Noakhali Science and Technology University (popularly known as NSTU) is a newly established public university in the coastal terrain Noakhali of Bangladesh. It is the 27th public university (out of 32) and fifth science and technology university in Bangladesh when it established, while in 2013, it places as 10th public university (out of 38) and 2nd science and technology university in national ranking. Its foundation stone was laid on 11 October 2003 and academic activities started on 22 June 2006.

Founding a science and technology university in a coastal terrain like Noakhali is significant. A newly accrued coastal system may render this university a versatile field station to study the pattern of changes in the seashore and to harness its opportunities.

Private College 
The best Private college is a National model college , This College is best of for Noakhali .

Textile-engineering colleges
 Akbar Ali Khan Textile Engineering College. Senbag,Noakhali. 

 Begumgonj Textile Engineering College, Noakhali

আতাউর রহমান ভূঁইয়া কলেজ,হোসেনপুর,মহেশগঞ্জ,সোনাইমুড়ী,নোয়াখালী         
 Senbag Government College. Senbag,Noakhali
Jalal Uddin Degree College
M. A. Hasem University College
 Noakhali Government College
 Chowmuhani Government S.A. College
Major Abdul Mannan college, Sadar, Noakhali.
 Charmotua College
 Yasin Institute of Technology
 Senbag Govt. Degree College, Senbagh Upazila, Noakhali
 Kankir Hat Degree College, Senbagh Upazila, Noakhali
 Maijdee Public College
 Noakhali Government Women's College
 Sonapur Degree College
 Kabir Hat Govt. College
 Govt.Mujib College, Companiganj
 Bamni Asiria Fazil/Degree Madrasah, Bamnia, Rampur
 Chaprashir Hat Ismail College, Chaprashir Hat
 Bhulua College, Kashimbazar
 Bamni College
 Chowdhury Hat College, Chowdhury Hat, Companiganj
 Baliakandi Degree College, Baliakandi, Bijbag, Senbag, Noakhali
Ataur Rahman Bhuiyan College,Hosenpur,Mahesganj,Sonaimuri, Noakhali

Medical colleges
 Abdul Malek Ukil Medical College
 Noakhali Homeopathic Medical College, Laxminarayanpur, Begumgonj.

Madrasah and specialized institutions
 Medical Assistant Training Institute (MATI), Maijdee, Noakhali
 Agriculture Training Institute (ATI), Begumganj
 Noakhali Islamia Alia Madrasa, Sonapur
 Noakhali Law College
 Noakhali Karamotia Alia Madrasha
 Software Information Technology 68068 Under Bangladesh Technical Education Board
 Bosontobug Islamia Fazil Madrasha.
 Bamni Asiria Fazil Madrasah
 Kashipur Fazil Madrasah, Sonaimuri, Noakhali
 Chachua Hazi Ali Akbar Alim Madrasha, Senbag, Noakhali.

High schools

Lakshmi Narayan pur high school
Eat: 1972.
Headmaster:Mohammad Sofi Uddin.
It's located in Lakshmi Narayan pur. Lakshmi Narayan pur is a village of Begumgonj, Noakhali. It was established in 1972. It is a popular school of Noakhali even in Bangladesh. It has about 1000 students. Highly educated persons pass their school life from this school. Such as Dr. Anowar Hossain MBBS, MD, PhD (medicine specialist).

Durgapur High school
Est: 1934.
Headmaster: Mohammad Abdul Mannan.
It is located in Notun Bajar, Durgapur with Durgapur Union Parishad Karjyaloy. More than 1200 student are studied in this school.
https://www.google.com/maps/place/Durgapur+High+School/@22.9574922,91.146297,3a,75y,90t/data=!3m8!1e2!3m6!1sAF1QipPrhoojppHC8zwAqBnOq-UE09cuDXnuMT_tgpg!2e10!3e12!6shttps:%2F%2Flh5.googleusercontent.com%2Fp%2FAF1QipPrhoojppHC8zwAqBnOq-UE09cuDXnuMT_tgpg%3Dw203-h152-k-no!7i1024!8i768!4m5!3m4!1s0x3754a19b10ca703d:0x451c6ec13211a289!8m2!3d22.9574922!4d91.146297#

Senbag Government Pilot High School,Noakhali 

Founder : Late Habibullah Chowdhury.

Senbag Government Pilot High School is a secondary government institution in Noakhali. It established in 1940. It is one of the famous school in Noakhali. It situated in Senbag Bazar, Noakhali (Near to DK Plaza). More than 600 students study in this school.

Facebook : Senbag Govt. Pilot High School.

Class Start :  10 am
Class Finished : 4 pm.

Ishaque pur Major Mannan High School,Sadar, Noakhali 
Founder: Major Rtd. Abdul Mannan.

Bazra M.L. High School
It is one of the largest school in the greater Noakhali. It was established in 1918. It is situated at Bazra Bazar, P.S.- Sonaimuri, Dist.- NOakhali......

Begumganj Govt. Pilot High School
Begumgonj Govt. Pilot High School is the largest and oldest school in Noakhali, Begumganj. It established in 1857. It is situated at Noakhali → Lakshmipur Highway.

Brother Andre's High School
Brother Andre's High School is one of the oldest schools in this district. It was established in 1967. More than 2,400 students study in this school. The school is situated in Sonapur of Noakhali sadar upozila.

Pana Mia T.F High School
Pana Mia T.F High School is the largest school in Sadar upazila, established in 1867. It is situated in Charmotua Union (Odar Hat), Sadar, Noakhali. In side of Union Porishad Office and it is situated in front of Pana Mia High School.

Hasan Hat High School 
Hasan Hat High School is a secondary school located at Babunagar,Begumgonj,Noakhali. It was established in 1968. More than 1,200 students study in this school.
More details_[facebook.com/officialhhhs1968]

Al-Farooq Academy
Al-Farooq Academy, Maijdee Court, Sadar, Noakhali, is one of the famous schools in this district. It was established in 1984 in the center of Noakhali. More than 1,200 students study in this school. The school is situated in Maijdee of Noakhali Sadar Upozila.

Kankirhat M.L High School
Kankirhat M.L high school is an academic institute located at Birkot Senbagh Noakhali.
Its institute code (EIIN) is 107478. It was established on 25 January, 1943. Its co-education type is Combined. The institute has following 3 disciplines: Science, Business studies, Humanities.
Its MPO number:-1105021301.
It has day shift. Its management is Managing

Success Model Academy 
Success Model Academy, Somitir Bazar, Ambar Nogor, Sonaimuri, Noakhali, is one of the most famous and old school in Noakhali District. It was established in 2019 with new name as Success Model School. Previous name was Success Kinder Garten.

Others
 Senbag Government Pilot High School, Noakhali.
It situated in DB Road, Senbag Upazila. Noakhali.
 Ishaque pur Major Mannan High School, Sadar, Noakhali.
Hasan Hat High School
Babunagar,Begumgonj, Noakhali
 Sonaimuri Residential Model School, Sonaimuri Noakhali, Founder:Md.Hasanuzzaman MBA
 Abir Para High School, Abir Para, Sonaimuri Noakhali
 Ahamadia High School, Sonapur
 Al-Farooq Academy, Maijdee Court, Sadar, Noakhali
 A K G Saydul Hoque Adarsha High School, Joynarayanpur, Begumganj, Noakhali
 Arun Chandra High School
 Ashadia High Girls School, Ashadia, Sadar
 Badalkote High School, Badalkote, Chatkhil, Noakhali
 Bamni High School, Bamnia,Rampur,
 Bandatta High School
 Basurhat A. H. C. Govt. High School
 Basurhat Ideal School
 Basurhat V V T C Technical School
 Begum Hamida Girls High School
 Begumganj Government Pilot High School
 Begumgonj Govt. Technical High School
 Bhuiyar Hat High School
 Bijbag N.K High School, Bijbag, Senbag, Noakhali
 Mohammad Pur Janata High School, Chatkhil, Noakhali
 Brother Andre's School Sonapur
 Chaprashir Hat High School
 Charparboti S. C. High School, Companiganj
 Chowmuhani Modon Mohon High School_Noakhali
 Companyganj Model School
 Darul Islam Model Academy
 Earpur High School, Earpur, Senbag, Noakhali
 Golden Time Model School & College, Maijdeecourt, Sadar, Noakhali
 Ghoshbag Kaderia High School, Notun Shahjir Hat
 Gonipur Govt. Girls' high school
 Harinarayanpur Union High School
Jamidar Hat B. N. High School, Jamindar Hat, Begumgong, Noakhali
Hirapu Model School & College, Chatkhil,Noakhali 
 Janata Bazar High School, Dhanshalik Union
 Joynul Abedin Memorial Academy
Kankirhat M.L High School, Senbag, Noakhali
 Kabi Jasim Uddin High School, Companigonj, Noakhali
 Kabilpur High School Senbag, Noakhali
 Kabir Hat Govt. High School
 Kashipur High School, Kashipur, Sonaimuri, Noakhali
 Lamchi Prasad High School, Takia Bazar
M.A. Rashid High School,Norottompur, Begumganj 
Fulkoli Model Academy, Chatterpaiya, Senbag, noakhali 
 Maksudah Govt. Girls' College, Companiganj
Mir Kashem ML High School,Mirwarishpur,Begumganj 
 Mosharraf Hossain High School, Chaprashir Hat
 Moulavi Moqbul High School, Chaprasir Hat
 Noakhali Government Girls' High School
 Odar Hat High School
 Peshkar Hat High School
 Pitamber Pur High School
 Poura Kalyan High School
 Mohammadpur Ramendra Model High School,Kailyandi,Senbagh,Noakhali
 Waseque Pur High School, Sonaimuri, Noakhali 
 Samsun Nahar High School, Bangla Bazar, Begumganj
 Senbag Girls' High School, Senbag Noakhali
 Senbag Govt. Pilot High School, Senbag, Noakhali
 Sonapur Ali Akber High School, Sonapur Bazar
 Thakar Hat Hazi Ahammed Ullah High School
 Zahazmara Chewakhali Dakhil Madrasa
 Rashidpur High School, Sonaimuri
 Mohammad Pur Janata High School, Chatkhil, Noakhali
 Kankirhat Ideal School, Kankirhat, Senbag, Noakhali.
 Kashipur Residential Model School, Kashipur Bazar, Sonaimuri, Noakhali.
 The most popular village is Thanar par 9 no word under 1 no Chaterpaiya union. There is a standard educational institution called Fayzunnesa Ibtedaye Model Madrasah (Established in 2019), which will comply International Standard Educational procedures. Besides the Islamic Education, this Madrasah's students will get the privilege of Spoken English and Arabic Conversation which is not available at other institutions in senbag thana. Besides it has mandatory Computer education and debate programmes. Mainly this Model Madrasah will be led by Chief Coordinator Mr. Abdul Ahad, Kamil Hadith, Jamea Ahamadia Kamil Madrasah, Chittagong, Manager HR AK Khan Group, Mr. Rakibul Hasan (Coordinator, student of Notre Dame College and Dhaka Divisional Debate champion,2016) and Md. Sharif Uddin (Principal), Khotib Thanar par Central Jame Mosque. There are perfectly trained and well skilled Teachers and its target is to ensure quality education and to be one of the best educational institution at Noakhali under Chattogram Division.

Primary and elementary schools
 Provati Shishu Shikha Protisthan
 Bidyaniketon Govt. Primary School, Maijdee Bazar
 Domnakandi Govt. Primary School kolyandi, Senbag
 Azizpur Govt. Primary School, Senbag
 Sahapur Govt. Primary School, Senbag
 Mohidipur Primary School, Senbag
 Kabilpur Govt. Primary School, Senbag
 Kolyandi Kindergarten School, Senbag
 Abdullah Miar Hat High School, Sodar
 Bazra High School
 Enayet Pur Primary School, Begumgonj, Noakhali
 Arun Chandra Govt. Primary School, Maijdee Bazar.
 Success Model Academy, Somitir Bazar, Sonaimuri, Noakhali.
Kashipur residential Model school,  Sonaimuri, Noakhali
Fulkoli Model Academy, Chatterpaiya, Senbag, noakhali

See also

 Education in Bangladesh
 List of schools in Bangladesh

Noakhali District

Westwind English Medium School,Sonaimuri, Noakhali